Frank Graham Finlayson (March 24, 1864 – February 9, 1947) served in the California legislature.  He also served as a Justice of the Supreme Court of California for a few months in 1926.

Early life and education
Finlayson was born March 24, 1864, in Bendigo, Victoria, Australia to James Ross Finlayson and Elizabeth Goodsir. In 1867, his family emigrated to California and he attended public schools. In 1885, he received a LL.B. degree from the University of California, Hastings College of the Law. He joined the California bar the same year.

Legal and judicial career
Following graduation, he engaged for two years in private practice in San Francisco with the firm of Ladd & Finlayson. He then moved to Los Angeles and formed the firm with his father of Finlayson & Finlayson. In November 1892, he was elected on the Democratic Party ticket to the California State Assembly from the 73rd district for a term beginning January 1893. In January 1894, he published a treatise on the law of street improvements. In 1895, he was appointed an Assistant United States District Attorney for the Southern District of California, a post his father also held.

In 1910, he ran successfully for the position of judge of the Los Angeles County Superior Court, which he held from January 2, 1911 to January 1, 1919, and was presiding judge from May 1, 1917. In February 1918, during World War I, Finlayson issued a permanent injunction against striking workers of the Southern California Iron and Steel Company. In June 1915, Finlayson was assigned to try to the artesian water case of City of San Bernardino v. City of Riverside.

In December 1918, Governor William Stephens appointed Finlayson as presiding judge of the newly created California Court of Appeal, Second District, Division Two, for a term starting January 1, 1919. By a drawing of lots with the other two justices appointed to the court, Finlayson was assigned the long, 12-year term. In November 1904, the voters had approved a constitutional amendment creating the Court of Appeals, with the Second District located in Los Angeles. Due to its busy docket, the Second District was expanded in 1919.

In October 1926, Governor Friend Richardson appointed Finlayson as Associate Justice of the California Supreme Court to fulfill the remainder of the term of Thomas J. Lennon, who died in office. In the October 1926 election, Finlayson ran for the remainder of the short term, ending January 5, 1931, but he lost to John W. Preston.

After stepping down from the bench on December 11, 1926, he re-entered private practice in the firm of Finlayson, Bennett and Morrow. He served on the State Bar of California Board of Governors from 1937 to 1940. He died February 9, 1947, in Los Angeles.

Personal life
On July 10, 1895, Finlayson married Agnes Thayer Henderson (June 29, 1867 – October 4, 1936), a widow, in Los Angeles. They had one daughter, Beatrice Finlayson (July 28, 1896 – November 10, 1979). Following the death of his first wife, on April 22, 1939, he remarried to Grace Davenport McConahy Reiniger (June 17, 1885 – October 27, 1961), also a widow.

References

External links
 In Memoriam for Frank G. Finlayson. 30 Cal. 2d 921 (1947). California Supreme Court Historical Society. Retrieved July 17, 2017.
 Court opinions by Frank G. Finlayson. CourtListener.com. Retrieved July 17, 2017. 
 Photo of Frank G. Finlayson (October 19, 1905). Los Angeles Herald. 33(18). p. 8. California Digital Newspaper Collection. Retrieved July 17, 2017.
 Frank G. Finlayson. California Court of Appeal, Second District, Division Two.
 Past & Present Justices. California State Courts. Retrieved July 19, 2017.
 Join California Frank G. Finlayson

See also
 List of justices of the Supreme Court of California

1864 births
1947 deaths
Australian emigrants to the United States
Justices of the Supreme Court of California
California state court judges
20th-century American judges
Superior court judges in the United States
20th-century American lawyers
Lawyers from Los Angeles
University of California, Hastings College of the Law alumni
Democratic Party members of the California State Assembly
Judges of the California Courts of Appeal
19th-century American politicians